Cipemastat (rINN, also known as Ro 32-3555 and by the tentative trade name Trocade) is a selective inhibitor of matrix metalloproteinase-1 that has been investigated as an anti-arthritis agent. It is being developed by Roche.

References

Hydantoins
Hydroxamic acids
Matrix metalloproteinase inhibitors
1-Piperidinyl compounds